"The Right Stuff" is a song by American singer and actress Vanessa Williams, released as the first single from her 1988 debut studio album of the same name. The crossover single was very successful and became a top-five hit on the US Billboard Hot R&B/Hip-Hop Songs chart, as well as making the Billboard Hot 100. "The Right Stuff" also went to number one on the Billboard Dance Club Songs chart for one week. It peaked at number 71 on the UK Singles Chart and re-entered the charts in 1989, this time peaking at number 62 with a remixed version. At the 31st Grammy Awards in 1989, the song received a Grammy Award nomination for Best Female R&B Vocal Performance, but lost to Anita Baker’s “Giving You The Best That I Got”.

Critical reception
Pan-European magazine Music & Media picked "The Right Stuff" as Single of the Week. They wrote, "Excellent funk/house/disco mixture from this hot new artist, or Miss America in 1983. The groove has a definite Jam/Lewis much, but with the dry synthesized percussion and the effective use of vocals and sampling, the overall atmosphere is irresistible and bound for the clubs."

Music video
The accompanying video for "The Right Stuff" was filmed in Baton Rouge and New Orleans.

Track listing and formats
 CD single
"The Right Stuff" (Extended Version) – 5:37 	
"The Right Stuff" (Radio Version) – 4:15 	
"The Right Stuff" (Dub-A-Delic) – 5:43

 12" vinyl maxi
A1. "The Right Stuff" (Radio Version) – 4:15 	
A2. "The Right Stuff" (Extended Version)  – 5:37 	
B1. "The Right Stuff" (Edited Version)  – 3:51 	
B2. "The Right Stuff" (Dub-A-Delic)  – 5:43

Charts

Weekly charts

Year-end charts

Notes

References

1988 debut singles
1988 songs
New jack swing songs
Songs written by Kipper Jones
Songs written by Rex Salas
Vanessa Williams songs
Wing Records singles